American Bandstand, abbreviated AB, is an American music-performance and dance television program that aired in various versions that aired regularly from 1952 to 1989, and was hosted from 1956 until its final season by Dick Clark, who also served as the program's producer. It featured teenagers dancing to Top 40 music introduced by Clark; at least one popular musical act—over the decades, running the gamut from Jerry Lee Lewis to Run–D.M.C.—usually appeared in person to lip-sync one of their latest singles. Artists would sing naturally to the studio audience over a background of their own disc, while viewers at home would hear only the original recording.  Freddy Cannon holds the record for most appearances, at 110.

The show's popularity helped Dick Clark become an American media mogul and inspired similar long-running music programs, such as Soul Train and British series Top of the Pops. Clark eventually assumed ownership of the program through his Dick Clark Productions company.

Background

American Bandstand premiered locally in late March 1952 as Bandstand on Philadelphia television station WFIL-TV Channel 6 (now WPVI-TV), as a replacement for a weekday movie that had shown predominantly British films. Hosted by Bob Horn as a television adjunct to his radio show of the same name on WFIL radio, Bandstand featured short musical films produced by Snader Telescriptions and Official Films, with occasional studio guests. This incarnation was an early version of the music video shows that became popular in the 1980s, featuring films that were the ancestors of music videos.

Horn, however, was disenchanted with the program, and wanted to change the show to a dance program with teenagers dancing along on camera as records played, based on an idea that came from a radio show on WPEN, The 950 Club, hosted by Joe Grady and Ed Hurst. This more-familiar version of Bandstand debuted on October 7, 1952, in "Studio 'B'", which was located in their just-completed addition to the original 1947 building in West Philadelphia, and was hosted by Horn, with Lee Stewart as co-host until 1955. Stewart was the owner of a TV/Radio business in Philadelphia and even though he was an older gentleman, his advertising account was a large one for WFIL-TV, so he was put on the program to appease the account. As WFIL grew financially and the account became less important, Stewart wasn't needed and was eventually dropped from the program. Tony Mammarella was the original producer with Ed Yates as director. The short Snader and Official music films continued in the short term to fill gaps when dancers were changed during the show—a necessity, because the studio could not fit more than 200 teenagers.

On July 9, 1956, Horn was fired after a drunk-driving arrest, as WFIL and dual owner Walter Annenberg's The Philadelphia Inquirer were then 
running a series on drunken driving. He was also reportedly involved in a prostitution ring and brought up on morals charges. Horn was temporarily replaced by producer Tony Mammarella before the job went to Dick Clark permanently.

In late spring of 1957, the ABC television network asked their O&O's and affiliates for programming suggestions to fill their 3:30 p.m. (ET) time slot (WFIL had been pre-empting the ABC programming with Bandstand). Clark decided to pitch the show to ABC president Thomas W. Moore, and after some negotiations the show was picked up nationally, becoming American Bandstand on August 5, 1957. This first national broadcast of American Bandstand was filmed in the Starlight Ballroom in Wildwood, NJ. One show from this first season (December 18, 1957, identified as the "Second National Telecast") is preserved in the archives of Chicago's Museum of Broadcast Communications.

One market not telecasting Bandstand was Baltimore, Maryland, as local affiliate WAAM (now WJZ-TV) elected to produce a local dance show in the same afternoon time slot. Local radio disc jockey Buddy Deane was chosen as the host of The Buddy Deane Show on Channel 13, and began a daily two hour broadcast on September 9, 1957. This development created a sometimes heated rivalry between Dick Clark and Buddy Deane, when performers who appeared first on Deane's program were refused booking on American Bandstand. Acts debuting on Bandstand appeared on Deane's program, but were asked to not mention their previous appearance with Clark while on the Baltimore show. The Buddy Deane Show aired on WJZ-TV until January 4, 1964.

"Studio 'B'" measured , but appeared smaller due to the number of props, television cameras, and risers that were used for the show. It was briefly shot in color in 1958 when WFIL-TV began experimenting with the new technology. Due to the size of the studio, the need to have as much dance space as possible, and the size of the cumbersome color camera compared to the black-and-white models, it was only possible to have one RCA TK-41 where three RCA TK-10s had been used before.  WFIL reverted to the TK-10s two weeks later when ABC refused to carry the color signal and management realized that the show lost perspective without the extra cameras.

Program features

Rate-a-Record
Clark regularly asked teenagers their opinions of the songs being played, through the "Rate-a-Record" segment. During the segment, two audience members each ranked two records on a scale of 35 to 98, after which their two opinions were averaged by Clark, who then asked the chosen members to justify their scores. The segment gave rise to the catchphrase "It's got a good beat and you can dance to it." In one humorous segment broadcast for years on retrospective shows, comedians Cheech and Chong appeared as the record raters.

Featured artists typically performed their current hits by lip-syncing to the released version of the song.

Hosts

The only singer to ever co-host the show with Dick Clark was Donna Summer, who joined him to present a special episode dedicated to the release of the Casablanca film Thank God It's Friday on May 27, 1978. From the late 1950s and most of the 1960s, Clark's on-camera sidekick was announcer Charlie O'Donnell, who later went on to announce Wheel of Fortune and other programs hosted or produced by Clark, such as The $100,000 Pyramid. There were occasional shows that were not hosted by Clark, in which case a substitute host (among them Rick Azar) was brought in.

Theme music
Bandstand originally used "High Society" by Artie Shaw as its theme song, but by the time the show went national, it had been replaced by various arrangements of Charles Albertine's "Bandstand Boogie", including Les Elgart's big-band recording remembered by viewers of the daily version.  From 1969 to 1974, "Bandstand Theme", a synthesized rock instrumental written by Mike Curb, opened each show. From 1974 to 1977, there was a newer, orchestral disco version of "Bandstand Boogie", arranged and performed by Joe Porter, played during the opening and closing credits.  Elgart's version was released as a single in March 1954 (Columbia 40180) as well as Curb's theme (by "Mike Curb & The Waterfall") in October 1969 (Forward 124).

From 1977 to September 6, 1986, the show opened and closed with Barry Manilow's rendition of "Bandstand Boogie", which he originally recorded for his 1975 album Tryin' to Get the Feeling. This version introduced lyrics written by Manilow and Bruce Sussman, referencing elements of the series. The previous theme was retained as bumper music. From September 13, 1986, to September 5, 1987, Manilow's version was replaced at the close of the show by a new closing theme arranged by David Russo, who also performed an updated instrumental arrangement of "Bandstand Boogie" when Bandstand went into syndication.

From 1974 to September 6, 1986, Bandstand featured another instrumental at its mid-show break: Billy Preston's synth hit "Space Race".

Changes to Bandstand

Early changes
When ABC picked up the game show Do You Trust Your Wife? from CBS in November 1957, they renamed the program as Who Do You Trust? and scheduled the program at 3:30 pm ET—almost in the middle of Bandstand. Instead of shortening or moving Bandstand, ABC opted to just begin Bandstand at 3 pm, cut away to Who Do You Trust? at 3:30 pm, then rejoin Bandstand at 4 pm. In Philadelphia, however, WFIL opted to tape-delay the game show for later broadcast in another time slot, and to continue on with Bandstand, though only for the local audience.

A half-hour evening version of American Bandstand aired on Monday nights from 7:30 p.m. to 8:00 p.m. (ET), beginning on October 7, 1957. It preceded The Guy Mitchell Show. Both were ratings disasters. Dick Clark later stated that he knew the prime-time edition would fail because its core audience – teenagers and housewives – was occupied with other interests in the evenings. The Monday-night version aired its last program in December 1957, but ABC gave Clark a Saturday-night time slot for The Dick Clark Saturday Night Beech-Nut Show, which originated from the Little Theatre in Manhattan, beginning on February 15, 1958. The Saturday show would run until 1960.

The program was broadcast live, weekday afternoons and, by 1959, the show had a national audience of 20 million. In the fall of 1961, ABC truncated American Bandstand'''s airtime from 90 to 60 minutes (4:00–5:00 pm ET), then even further as a daily half-hour (4:00–4:30 pm ET) program in September 1962; beginning in early 1963, all five shows for the upcoming week were videotaped the preceding Saturday. The use of videotape allowed Clark to produce and host a series of concert tours around the success of American Bandstand and to pursue other broadcast interests. On September 7, 1963, the program was moved from its weekday slot and began airing weekly every Saturday afternoon, restored to an hour, until 1989.

Move from Philadelphia to Los Angeles

When WFIL-TV moved to a new facility on City Line Avenue (one that did not have a studio that could accommodate the show),  ABC moved production of Bandstand to the ABC Television Center (stage 5) in Los Angeles (now known as The Prospect Studios) on February 8, 1964, which coincidentally was the day before the Beatles first appeared on The Ed Sullivan Show. Prior to the move, Bandstand had sourced many of its up-and-coming acts from Philadelphia's Cameo-Parkway Records. The combined impact of Bandstand's move to California and the Beatles' arrival devastated Cameo-Parkway and inflicted permanent damage to the artists signed to the label.

The program was permanently shot in color starting on September 9, 1967. The typical production schedule consisted of videotaping three shows on a Saturday and three shows on a Sunday, every six weeks. The shows were usually produced in either Stage 54 or Stage 55 at ABC Television Center.

In September 1964, Bandstand began using a new logo based on the ABC circle logo, reading "ab" in the same typeface followed by a number representing the year the show aired.  This started with "'65", then "'66", "'67", "'68" and "'69" when each year arrived. On September 13, 1969, the Bandstand set was given a complete overhaul and Les Elgart's big band version of "Bandstand Boogie" was replaced by the Mike Curb theme. The "ab" logo was replaced with the iconic stylized "AB" logo (shown at the top of this page) used for the remainder of the show's run. This set and theme music were used until September 1974, with the arrival of a brand new set and the second, updated version of "Bandstand Boogie".

For a brief time in 1973, Bandstand alternated its time slot with Soul Unlimited, a show featuring soul music that was hosted by Buster Jones. Soul Unlimited was not well-received among its target audience of African-Americans, ostensibly due to its being created by a white man (Clark), and because of its alleged usage of deliberately racial overtones despite this fact. Don Cornelius, the creator and host of Soul Train, along with Jesse Jackson, entered into a dispute with Clark over this upstart program, and it was canceled within a few weeks. Set pieces from Soul Unlimited were utilized by Bandstand for its 1974–1978 set design. As previously mentioned, during the 1978 season of Bandstand, Donna Summer became the only music artist in Bandstands history to co-host the program.

Bandstand "regulars" from the Philadelphia years
Many local Philadelphia teenagers became household names by appearing and dancing on American Bandstand on a regular basis from the '50s to the early '60s: 

Charles Amann†
Mike Balera†
Bobby Baritz†
Mary Beltrante
Marlyn Brown
Joan Buck†
Ron Caldora†
Justine Carelli
Ritchie Cartledge†
Bob Clayton†
Bill Cook†
Mary Ann Colella†
Eddie Connor
Mary Ann Cuff†
Lou DeSero
Rosemary Dicristo
Micki Duffy†
Bob Durkin†
Joe Fusco†
Nick Gaeta†
Bunny Gibson
Frani Giordano
Walter Grezlack†
Janet Hamill
Bonnie Harden†
Charlie Hibb†
Dottie Horner†
Myrna Horowitz†
Lorraine Ianetti†
Diane Iaquinto
Joe Jacovini†
Carmen Jimenez
Ivette Jimenez
Bob Kelly†
Ed Kelly
Norman Kerr†
Paula Kopicko†
George Kralle†
Barbara Levick
Frankie Levins†
Frank Lobis†
Carol McColley†
Barbara Marcen
Pat Moliterri†
Ann Monahan†
Joann Montecarlo†
Monte Montes†
Bill Mulivihill†
Debra Murphy
M.B. Murphy
Jimmy Peatross†
Harvey Robbins†
Kenny Rossi
Carole Scaldeferri†
Terry Schreffler†
Joyce Shafer
Ray Smith
Frank Spagnuola
Arlene Sullivan
Joe Sullivan†
Paul Thomas†
Frank Vacca
Ronnie Verbit
Joe Wissert
Charlie Zamil

†Deceased

Move from ABC to syndication and the USA Network
As Bandstand moved towards the 1980s, the ratings began to decline. Many factors were involved in this, particularly the launch and rise of MTV and other music programs on television, and along with that, the number of ABC affiliates opting to pre-empt or delay the program. The increase in competition hurt Bandstand and the variety of options for music on TV decreased its relevance. The other reason was that American Bandstand was pre-empted on many occasions by televised college football games (which expanded greatly in number in the wake of a court-ordered deregulation in 1984) which were becoming huge ratings successes, as well as occasional special presentations (i.e. unsold game show pilots). Making matters worse, on September 13, 1986, ABC reduced Bandstand from a full hour to 30 minutes; at Clark's request, the 2,751st and final ABC installment (with Laura Branigan performing "Shattered Glass") aired on September 5, 1987.

Two weeks later, Bandstand moved to first-run syndication. Dubbed as The New American Bandstand and distributed by LBS Communications, the series' tapings were moved from the ABC Television Center to the Hollywood studios of Los Angeles's PBS member station KCET, with a new set similar to that of Soul Train. Clark continued as host of the series, which was restored to its former hour length, and aired on stations including KYW-TV in Philadelphia; WWOR-TV in New York City (WWOR's superstation status also gave the program further national exposure); KTLA in Los Angeles; WMAQ-TV in Chicago; WDIV in Detroit; WEWS in Cleveland; WTMJ-TV in Milwaukee; and WCIX in Miami.

The first syndicated episode aired on the weekend of September 19, 1987 but this run was short-lived; The New American Bandstand ran until the weekend of June 4, 1988.

After a ten-month hiatus, Bandstand moved to cable on USA Network on April 8, 1989, with comedian David Hirsch taking over hosting duties. In another format shift, it was shot outdoors at Universal Studios Hollywood. Clark remained as executive producer. This version was canceled after 26 weeks, and its final show (with The Cover Girls performing "My Heart Skips a Beat" and "We Can't Go Wrong") aired on October 7, 1989, thus ending the show's 37-year run.

Civil rights movement and social impact
With American Bandstand being originally located in Philadelphia, segregation easily affected the concentrated area. "With Bandstand, WFIL resolved this tension by drawing on Philadelphia's interracial music scene to create an entertaining and profitable television show, while refusing to allow the city's black teenagers into the studio audience for fear of alienating viewers and advertisers. Like the white homeowners associations' concerns about property values, WFIL's version of defensive localism built on a belief that integration would hurt the station's investment in Bandstand." WFIL defended these local associations in order to maintain support.

Once the program went national upon its move to Los Angeles, new host Dick Clark decided that integration was the most responsible move. History goes back and forth with the timing and motives of the integration, but nevertheless, American Bandstand socially impacted teenagers' opinions regarding race.

 American Bandstand Anniversary Specials 
American Bandstand's 20th Anniversary (1973)
American Bandstand's 25th Anniversary (1977)
American Bandstand's 30th Anniversary (1982)
American Bandstand's 33 1/3 Celebration (1985)
American Bandstand's 40th Anniversary (1992)
American Bandstand's 50th Anniversary (2002)

50th anniversary

On May 3, 2002, Dick Clark hosted a one-off special 50th anniversary edition on ABC. Michael Jackson, a frequent Bandstand guest, performed 
"Dangerous". The Village People performed their legendary song, "YMCA" for the audience in Pasadena, California. Other performers including Brandy, members of KISS, Dennis Quaid and his band The Sharks, Cher, and Stevie Wonder also performed to remember the iconic program.

Revival plans
In 2004, Dick Clark, with the help of Ryan Seacrest, announced plans to revive the show in time for the 2005 season; although this did not occur (due in part to Clark suffering a severe stroke in late 2004), one segment of the revived Bandstand—a national dance contest—eventually became the series So You Think You Can Dance. Dick Clark Productions is credited as the show's co-producer, and longtime employee Allen Shapiro serves as co-executive producer. While the American series has aired sixteen seasons, its format was also replicated worldwide, from Norway (Dansefeber) to Australia (So You Think You Can Dance Australia).

Dick Clark died on April 18, 2012, at the age of 82.

LegacyAmerican Bandstand played a crucial role in introducing Americans to such famous artists as Prince, Jackson 5, Sonny and Cher, Aerosmith, and John Lydon's PiL—all of whom made their American TV debuts on the show. American Bandstand was a daily ritual for many teenagers throughout the nation. The Top 40 hits that everyone heard were matched with fun routines performed by relatable teenagers. It became a staple in homes and heavily influenced American society culturally, musically, and socially. It also was a prototype for musical television properties including cable channel MTV and Fox's reality-competition show American Idol.

References in popular culture
 In the 1958 song "Queen of the Hop", Bobby Darin mentions the show, while also indicating its daily TV schedule during the early years of the show.
 In his song "Sweet Little Sixteen" recorded 1957, Chuck Berry name-checks the show with the lyric "Cause they'll be rocking on Bandstand in Philadelphia, PA".
 Travis Bickle watches American Bandstand while holding his Model 29 in Taxi Driver, while Jackson Browne's "Late for the Sky" plays.
 The show was featured prominently in the 2002–2005 NBC-TV drama series American Dreams, which like Bandstand was executive produced by Dick Clark. In a 2005 episode, Eddie Kelly and Bunny Gibson – one of the most famous couples to appear on American Bandstand in the Philadelphia years – were the only two to make cameo appearances on the acclaimed TV series. Along with that, Kelly and Gibson were named a number of times in the script, and Kelly referred to in the last episode. Actor Paul D. Roberts made frequent appearances as Dick Clark, while Michael Burger played announcer Charlie O'Donnell. Clark frequently provided voice-overs as his younger self.
 In the film Escape from New York, the theme song is heard while in the cab and near the end when Snake Plissken takes out the President's address and replaces it with the tape that had the American Bandstand theme.
 In the animated TV series King of the Hill while Bobby is cleaning the gutters on the roof he is attacked by a bird. Hank hears him stomping around and shouts "It's a roof, not American Bandstand!"
 The live national program National Bandstand in the film version of Grease was an ode to the American Bandstand; director Randal Kleiser lived in the suburbs of Philadelphia during the real Bandstand's early years and adapted the original source material (which used a radio show instead) to match his own upbringing.
 Pam Tillis' video for her 1994 cover of "When You Walk in the Room" depicted a mid-1960s performance on American Bandstand, and featured a voiceover by Dick Clark.
 In the quarterfinals of season 7 of America's Got Talent, contestant Ulysses performed a cover of the American Bandstand theme song.
 In episode 4089 of Sesame Street, there was a parody of American Bandstand called "American Fruit Stand" where a duck named "Duck Clark" hosted the program. It featured Miles singing songs about fruits to the tune of famous oldies songs such as "Johnny B. Goode", "Twist and Shout", and "I Feel Good".
 The lyric video for Sia's song "Cheap Thrills" features a show reminiscent of American Bandstand ("Dance Stage USA").
 In the film Peggy Sue Got Married, Peggy Sue time-travels from 1985 back to 1960 and watches American Bandstand and remarks that Dick Clark never ages.
 On Archie Bell and the Drells's song "I Could Danced All Night" from their 1975 album Dance Your Troubles Away, they reference both Bandstand and Soul Train.
 On Jersey Boys, Frankie Valli & The Four Seasons perform the song "Sherry" to an audience on American Bandstand. In real life, they were asked to perform "Big Girls Don't Cry".
 Soul for Real's video for "If You Want It" shows the group performing on the American Bandstand stage, with Clark making a cameo at the beginning and end of the clip.
 The September 17, 1983 episode of the Chicago-based horror movie television program Son of Svengoolie opened with a song parody of The Beatles' "Good Morning Good Morning", with lyrics referencing the show's move to a 10 AM Saturday time slot. The song was sung by show star Rich Koz. The particular verse that references American Bandstand is "People tuning in at 10 o'clock/Find you on their sets and it's a shock/Later on they'll leave you in the dark/When they change the channel to Dick Clark."

See also

 List of acts who appeared on American Bandstand
 Bandstand, Australian version loosely based on the American version
 Top of the Pops, a similar British music program
 The Buddy Deane Show Soul Train The Clay Cole Show Electric Circus CD USAReferences

Further reading
 Matthew F. Delmont, The Nicest Kids in Town: American Bandstand, Rock'n'Roll, and the Struggle for Civil Rights in 1950s Philadelphia. Berkeley, CA: University of California Press, 2012.
 Murray Forman, One Night on TV is Worth Weeks at the Paramount: Popular Music on Early Television.'' Durham, NC: Duke University Press, 2012.

External links

The Museum of Broadcast Communications – American Bandstand

1952 American television series debuts
1989 American television series endings
1950s American variety television series
1960s American variety television series
1970s American variety television series
1980s American variety television series
American Broadcasting Company original programming
American music chart television shows
American live television shows
Black-and-white American television shows
Dance television shows
English-language television shows
First-run syndicated television programs in the United States
Pop music television series
Rock music television series
Television series by Dick Clark Productions
Culture of Philadelphia
Television in Philadelphia
USA Network original programming